Francisco Fernandes Moreira (born 6 September 1985) is a French-Portuguese rugby union player. He plays as a prop. He was born and has made his career in France, but decided to represent Portugal, the country of his origin.

Club career
He first played for AS Soustons. He moved to US Tyrosse, where he would play from 2005/06 to 2010/11, first at the Pro D2, and after the first season at the Fédérale 1. He moved to AS Béziers Hérault at 2011/12, at Pro D2, his first professional team, where he has been playing since then. He reached the mark of 250 games at the Pro D2 in 2021.

International career
Fernandes has 32 caps for Portugal, with 2 tries cored, 10 points on aggregate, since his debut at the 14-10 loss to Russia, at 6 February 2010, in Sochi, for the 2011 Rugby World Cup qualifyings, when he was 24 years old. He has been playing more regularly for the Portuguese side since 2020, where he is currently the oldest player, at 36 years old.

References

1985 births
Living people
Portuguese rugby union players
Portugal international rugby union players
French rugby union players
French people of Portuguese descent
Rugby union props
AS Béziers Hérault players